Nawwaf bin Nayef Al Saud (born 1988) is a member of House of Saud and a businessman. He was detained in March 2020 together with other senior royals, including Mohammed bin Nayef and Ahmed bin Abdulaziz. Prince Nawwaf was released in August 2020.

Biography
Prince Nawwaf was born in 1988. He is one of five children of former Crown Prince Nayef bin Abdulaziz and Maha bint Mohammed Al Sudairi. His parents divorced. His full siblings are Nouf, Mishail, Hayfa and Fahd.

As of 2014 Nawwaf bin Nayef served as an administrative attaché at the Embassy of Saudi Arabia in the United States. His spouse is Al Anoud bint Sultan, daughter of Prince Sultan bin Abdulaziz.

Arrest
Nawwaf bin Nayef was arrested in March 2020 along with his older brother and former Crown Prince Mohammed bin Nayef who was dismissed from his governmental positions in 2017. They were together in a desert camp when they were detained. In the same incident their uncle and King Salman's full-brother Ahmed bin Abdulaziz was also arrested. David D. Kirkpatrick and Ben Hubbard of The New York Times argue that this move was to eliminate the potential threats to Crown Prince Mohammed bin Salman. In August 2020 some Twitter accounts and his lawyers reported that Prince Nawwaf was released, but they also added that it was not clear where he was.

References

Nawwaf
Nawwaf
1988 births
Living people
Nawwaf
Saudi Arabian prisoners and detainees